William Bulloch may refer to:

 William Bellinger Bulloch (1777–1852), American politician
 William Bulloch (bacteriologist) (1868–1941), British bacteriologist
 William Ross Bulloch (1884–1954), Canadian politician in the Legislative Assembly of Quebec